Mirosław Małolepszy (16 June 1955 – 14 October 2022) was a Polish footballer who played as a defender for Korona Kielce, Raków Częstochowa, Zagłębie Sosnowiec and Skra Częstochowa.

References

External links
Mirosław Małolepszy - 90minut.pl profile

1955 births
2022 deaths
Polish footballers
Association football defenders
Raków Częstochowa players
Zagłębie Sosnowiec players
Skra Częstochowa players
Korona Kielce players